Jabalia Camp is a Palestinian refugee camp located  north of Jabalia in the Gaza Strip.

History
The Jabalia refugee camp is in the North Gaza Governorate, Gaza Strip. According to the Palestinian Central Bureau of Statistics, the camp had a population of 93,455 in mid-year 2006.

The camp had a registered population of 103,646 inhabitants on June 30, 2002, and is located at the northern end of the Gaza Strip, close to the Israeli border and a village with the same name. The camp only covers an area of 1.4 km² making it one of the most densely populated places on Earth. The First Intifada in December 1987 began in Jabalia. The camp has been the scene of much violence in the Israeli–Palestinian conflict. It is also considered a major stronghold of the Hamas movement. The camp is the largest refugee camp in Palestinian territory.

During the 2014 Israel–Gaza conflict, Israeli artillery reportedly hit an UNWRA school in Jabalia Camp, killing at least 15 Palestinians sheltering there. A UN spokesman stated: "Last night, children were killed as they slept next to their parents on the floor of a classroom in a UN-designated shelter in Gaza. Children killed in their sleep; this is an affront to all of us, a source of universal shame. Today the world stands disgraced."

In 2022, a fire killed 21 people.

Notable people
 Atef Abu Saif, writer
 Izzeldin Abuelaish, physician
 Mahmoud al-Mabhouh, Hamas commander

See also

 Gaza Ghetto
 Al-Fakhura school incident

References

External links

Jabalia, articles from UNWRA
 Jabalia  camp profile
Welcome To Jabalya R.C.

Palestinian refugee camps in the Gaza Strip